Ganda Hendathi is a 2006 Indian Kannada-language erotic thriller film, directed by Ravi Shrivatsa and produced by Shailendra Babu. The film stars newcomers Vishal Hegde, Sanjjanaa and Thilak Shekar.

The film is a remake of Hindi hit film Murder (2004), starring Emraan Hashmi, Ashmit Patel and Mallika Sherawat. The film created huge controversies upon release for its excessive erotic scenes and content. The score and soundtrack was composed by Gurukiran for the lyrics of V. Manohar and Hrudaya Shiva.

Cast
Vishal Hegde as Susheel
Sanjjanaa Galrani as Sanjana
Tilak Shekar as Sachin
Ravi Belagere 
Manju Bhashini
Praveen
Rachana Maurya as item number

Soundtrack
The music was composed by Gurukiran with most of the songs (except "Don't Let Me") directly copied from the original compositions by Anu Malik.

Critical reception
The film received mixed reviews, being described as 'bold' by one reviewer but as 'rash and ridiculous' by another.

References

External links

2000s Kannada-language films
Kannada remakes of Hindi films
Indian erotic thriller films
Films scored by Gurukiran
Indian remakes of American films